Winkelstein is a surname. Notable people with the surname include:

Asher Winkelstein (1893–1972), American gastroenterologist
Beth Winkelstein, American bioengineer and scholar
Warren Winkelstein (1922–2012), American epidemiologist